Noël de Graauw (born 28 June 1997) is a Dutch football player.

Club career
He made his Eerste Divisie debut for RKC Waalwijk on 18 August 2017 in a game against FC Emmen.

References

External links
 
 

1997 births
Footballers from Breda
Living people
Dutch footballers
RKC Waalwijk players
Eerste Divisie players
Association football midfielders